Olga Flor (born 1968) is an Austrian writer.

Life 
Flor was born in Vienna. She grew up in Vienna, Cologne and Graz and completed her Matura at Akademisches Gymnasium Graz. Flor studied physics and history at the University of Graz. From 1997 to 1999, Flor stayed in Modena. The monologue Fleischgerichte premiered in 2004 at the Graz theater. She has worked for multimedia enterprises, written several books and received literary awards like the Anton Wildgans Prize in 2013.

She's a member of the Grazer Autorenversammlung.

Awards
 2013 Anton Wildgans Prize
 2018 Droste Prize
 2019 Franz Nabl Prize, Graz

Works

References

Further readiung

External links

 
 

1968 births
Living people
Writers from Vienna
Anton Wildgans Prize winners
University of Graz alumni